Enrico Nicolas Rodrigo Cuenca is a Filipino actor appearing in TV shows like Super Ma'am starring GMA-7's Primetime Queen Marian Rivera and episodes in Wagas and Daig Kayo ng Lola Ko.  He has also appeared in commercials from Filipino fast-food chain Jollibee.

Cuenca is a member of GMA Artist Center, and is 5'10" tall.

Enrico started acting in theatre at a young age. He studied at the Ateneo De Manila University and graduated from California State University in Long Beach, California. Cuenca is signed with Mercator Model Management managed by Jonas Gaffud.

Cuenca starred in the viral Valentine’s Day Jollibee commercial entitled “Crush” with fellow GMA Network artist Ash Ortega, as well as its sequel the following year entitled "Homecoming". Enrico has since appeared in the movies Recipe for Love and Spirit of the Glass 2: The Haunted, playing a character named  Andre.

Filmography

Television

Film

References

External links

1991 births
Living people
Place of birth missing (living people)
California State University, Long Beach alumni
People from Makati
Male actors from Metro Manila
21st-century Filipino male actors
GMA Network personalities